The following lists events that happened during 1955 in the Union of Soviet Socialist Republics.

Incumbents
 First Secretary of the Communist Party of the Soviet Union – Nikita Khrushchev
 Chairman of the Presidium of the Supreme Soviet of the Soviet Union – Kliment Voroshilov
 Chairman of the Council of Ministers of the Soviet Union – Georgy Malenkov (until 8 February), Nikolai Bulganin (starting 8 February)

Events

February
 27 February
 1955 Estonian Supreme Soviet election
 1955 Soviet Union regional elections

May
 14 May – Warsaw Pact

June
 2 June – Belgrade declaration

November
 15 November – Władysław Gomułka initiates talks about the Repatriation of Poles (1955–59).
 22 November – The first Soviet hydrogen bomb, RDS-37, is tested.
 30 November – The 1st Soviet Antarctic Expedition begins.

December
 31 December – The Pospelov Commission is set up.

Births
 1 January – Gennady Lyachin, Russian submarine captain (d. 2000)
 29 January – Zebiniso Rustamova, archer
 10 February – Oksana Shvets, Ukrainian actress (d. 2022)
 22 March – Valdis Zatlers, President of Latvia
 16 May – Olga Korbut, Belorussian Olympic gymnast
 11 June – Yuriy Sedykh, Ukrainian hammer thrower (d. 2021)
 1 July – Nikolai Demidenko, pianist
 7 August – Vladimir Sorokin, writer
 7 September – Efim Zelmanov, mathematician
 13 October – Sergei Shepelev, ice hockey player

Deaths
 6 January – Yevgeny Tarle, historian (born 1874)
 30 September – Michael Chekhov, actor (born 1891)

See also
 1955 in fine arts of the Soviet Union
 List of Soviet films of 1955

References

 
1950s in the Soviet Union
Years in the Soviet Union
Soviet Union
Soviet Union
Soviet Union